The Church of the Immaculate Conception is a historic Roman Catholic church building in the unincorporated community of St. Anna, Minnesota, United States.  It is part of the Roman Catholic Diocese of Saint Cloud.  The church was constructed in 1902 in a rural community settled by Polish immigrants.  It was listed on the National Register of Historic Places in 1982 for its state-level significance in the themes of architecture, exploration/settlement, and religion.  It was nominated for reflecting the settlement of rural Stearns County by Catholic immigrant groups clustered in small, ethnic hamlets dominated by a central church.

History
St. Anna was established on the shore of Pelican Lake by Catholic immigrants from Poland.  Their first church, a small wood-frame building, was built in 1887.  It was completely destroyed by fire in June 1902.  A new building, of yellow brick, was constructed in the winter of 1902 and dedicated in October 1903.

Immaculate Conception is part of a cluster of three parishes known as the Two Rivers Catholic Community.  The other parishes are St. Stanislaus Kostka in Bowlus and All Saints in Holdingford.

See also
 List of Catholic churches in the United States
 National Register of Historic Places listings in Stearns County, Minnesota

References

External links
 
 Two Rivers Catholic Community

1902 establishments in Minnesota
Churches in Stearns County, Minnesota
Churches in the Roman Catholic Diocese of Saint Cloud
National Register of Historic Places in Stearns County, Minnesota
Polish-American culture in Minnesota
Roman Catholic churches completed in 1902
Churches on the National Register of Historic Places in Minnesota
Romanesque Revival church buildings in Minnesota
20th-century Roman Catholic church buildings in the United States